Another Night in the Sun: Live in Helsinki is the first live album by Finnish glam rock singer Michael Monroe, released on 5 October 2010, through Spinefarm Records. It is Monroe's first album with his new live backing band formed in early 2010 (which includes former Hanoi Rocks bassist Sami Yaffa), and first solo release since Hanoi Rocks' final break-up/retirement in 2009.

The live show was recorded on 7 June 2010 at the Tavastia Club in Helsinki, and features songs from Monroe's solo career, as well as songs from his tenure with Hanoi Rocks and Demolition 23, and a few covers.

The album was mixed by famed American producer and sound engineer Niko Bolas who has previously worked with such artists as Neil Young and Kiss, and mastered by Grammy-winning engineer Richard Dodd, who has previously worked with Tom Petty and the Dixie Chicks.

Track listing

Personnel
Michael Monroe - lead vocals, harmonica, saxophone
Ginger Wildheart - guitar, vocals
Steve Conte - guitar, vocals
Sami Yaffa - bass, vocals
Karl Rosqvist - drums, percussion

Michael Monroe albums
2010 live albums
Spinefarm Records live albums